Skandaali tyttökoulussa (English: Scandal in the Girls' School) is a 1960 Finnish drama film directed by Edvin Laine. It was entered into the 2nd Moscow International Film Festival.

Cast
 Liisa Nevalainen as Sanny Kortman
 Elsa Turakainen as Hilja Eufrosyne Forslund
 Hilkka Helinä as Olga Kauppala
 Elina Salo as Liisa 'Liisi' Kortman
 Leo Riuttu as Lassinen, Teacher
 Kosti Klemelä as Amos Pölkkynen
 Martti Romppanen as Veikko 'Nalle' Vuorela
 Liisa Roine as Anna Tapper
 Seija Haarala as Helmi Hallman
 Elina Ollikainen as Inkeri
 Rose-Marie Precht as Kerttu

References

External links
 

1960 films
1960 drama films
1960s Finnish-language films
Finnish black-and-white films
Finnish drama films
Films directed by Edvin Laine